Arthritica is a genus of bivalves belonging to the family Lasaeidae.

The species of this genus are found in Australia and New Zealand.

Species:

Arthritica ambotruncata 
Arthritica bifurca 
Arthritica crassiformis 
Arthritica crassitesta 
Arthritica dispar 
Arthritica elongata 
Arthritica finlayi 
Arthritica helmsi 
Arthritica hulmei 
Arthritica japonica 
Arthritica perfragilis 
Arthritica reikoae 
Arthritica semen 
Arthritica whitechurchi

References

Lasaeidae
Bivalve genera